Locotracteurs Gaston Moyse was a French manufacturer of diesel shunting locomotives. Founded in 1922 by Gaston Moyse, the company closed in the late 1970s.

The company produced numerous shunting locomotives, including the Y 7400 and Y 8000 for the French state railways (SNCF), and classes CP 1020 and CP 1050 for the Portuguese state railways (Comboios de Portugal). and shunters for industrial use in steel works and on other industrial sites.

References

External links

Defunct locomotive manufacturers of France
Manufacturing companies based in Paris
Manufacturing companies established in 1922
Manufacturing companies disestablished in 1977
French companies established in 1922
1977 disestablishments in France